Arthur Ernest Schlichter (born April 25, 1960) is an American former football quarterback who played in the National Football League (NFL) for four seasons with the Colts franchise. He also played one Canadian Football League (CFL) season with the Ottawa Rough Riders and three Arena Football League (AFL) seasons with the Detroit Drive and Cincinnati Rockers. A highly-touted collegiate prospect at Ohio State, Schlichter's professional career was cut short by a gambling addiction that resulted in him facing legal trouble for nearly five decades.

Selected fourth overall in the 1982 NFL Draft by the Colts, Schlichter appeared in only 13 games and six starts due to his gambling problems. He found greater success in the AFL, where he was named Most Valuable Player and led the Drive to victory in ArenaBowl IV during the 1990 season, but was also forced out due to his addiction. Schlichter continued to face legal problems after the end of his football career, including serving a 10-year sentence on gambling-related theft charges from 2011 to 2021.

Early life
Schlichter was born in Bloomingburg, Ohio, between Columbus and Cincinnati. He was a football and basketball star at Miami Trace High School. He never lost a game in 30 starts at quarterback; his record was only blemished by one tie. His gambling habit began in high school with a visit to Scioto Downs, a harness racing track near Columbus. He and several friends pooled their resources to bet on a race at Scioto Downs, and won. He quickly became a regular, and Scioto Downs remained his favorite track over the years.

Schlichter was a four-year starter at Ohio State University. He was the last starting quarterback for legendary Buckeyes coach Woody Hayes. According to his father, Max, Hayes was so enthralled with Art that he was willing to jettison his "three yards and a cloud of dust" offense and throw as many as 25 times a game if he signed with the Buckeyes. Schlichter threw the interception that led to Hayes' assault on Clemson linebacker Charlie Bauman in the 1978 Gator Bowl, an act that led to the coach's firing the next day. Schlichter finished in the top six of Heisman Trophy balloting during his last three years—fourth as a sophomore, sixth as a junior and fifth as a senior. In his sophomore year, 1979, he led the Buckeyes to an undefeated regular season. They had a chance to win at least a share of the national championship in the Rose Bowl, but lost to USC by one point.

In his four years as a Buckeye, 1978 through 1981, Schlichter tallied 7,547 passing yards and 50 touchdown passes, with 46 interceptions.  He also rushed for 1,303 yards and 35 touchdowns. At the time, he was Ohio State's all-time leader in total offense. In 1981, sports writer Ritter Collett published a biography of Schlichter, Straight Arrow.

During his college career, Schlichter was frequently spotted at Scioto Downs with a prominent Ohio gambler. Although the Columbus and OSU police departments became suspicious, the athletic department felt it lacked enough evidence to go to the NCAA about the matter. He turned his attention from horses to games by his junior year at Ohio State; by the end of that year he had lost thousands of dollars gambling on college and professional sports. On several occasions he was seen at the track with Hayes' successor as head coach, Earle Bruce, a fact which helped cover up early problems emerging while Schlichter was at Ohio State.

Professional career
Schlichter was picked fourth in the 1982 NFL Draft by the Baltimore Colts (who moved to Indianapolis two years later). Expected to be the starter, he lost the job to Mike Pagel, the Colts' fourth-round pick in that year. However, he was expected to be the Colts' quarterback of the future.

His gambling continued unabated and he blew his entire $350,000 signing bonus by midseason. Even before the Colts picked him, he already owed bookies several thousand dollars. His gambling spiraled out of control during the 1982 NFL strike, when he lost $20,000 betting on college football. By the end of the strike, he had at least $700,000 in gambling debts. Years later, he said his massive losses stemmed from desperate efforts to make good his previous losses. After losing $20,000 in the first week of the strike, he doubled up the next week and lost again—starting a cycle that would continue for over a year.

In the winter of 1982 and the spring of 1983, Schlichter lost $489,000 betting on basketball games and his bookies threatened to expose him if he did not pay up (the NFL forbids its players from engaging in any kind of gambling activity, legal or otherwise). Schlichter went to the FBI in March 1983 and his testimony helped get the bookies arrested on federal charges. He also sought the help of the NFL because he feared the bookies would force him to throw games in return for not telling the Colts about his activities. The league suspended him indefinitely but Commissioner Pete Rozelle reduced the suspension to 13 months after Schlichter agreed to seek treatment. Schlichter was the first NFL player to be suspended for gambling since Alex Karras and Paul Hornung were suspended in 1963 for betting on NFL games.

He was reinstated for the 1984 season but later admitted that he'd gambled during his suspension (though not on football). He was released five games into the 1985 season in part because the Colts heard rumors he was gambling again. As it turned out, he lost a significant amount of money over the spring and summer while playing golf and wrote one of his golfing partners a check for $2,000. The check was to be cashed after the season started. However, when the golfing partner called the Colts to see if the check was good, team and league officials feared Schlichter had relapsed. The league wanted him to take a lie-detector test but Colts coach Rod Dowhower had already seen enough and pushed the Colts front office to release him.

It would be Schlichter's last meaningful action in the NFL. He signed as a free agent with the Buffalo Bills in the spring of 1986. However, his tenure in Buffalo effectively ended when the United States Football League collapsed. Jim Kelly, the Bills' 1983 first-round pick, had bolted to the USFL instead but signed with the Bills when the USFL lost its antitrust lawsuit. The Bills had intended all along for Kelly to be their quarterback of the future. With Kelly now firmly in the Bills fold, Schlichter's services were no longer necessary. He sat out the 1986 season after no other team expressed interest.

In January 1987, Schlichter was arrested in New York City for his involvement in a multimillion-dollar sports betting operation. He pleaded guilty to illegal gambling in April and was sentenced to probation. That arrest came back to haunt him that summer. The Cincinnati Bengals saw enough promise in him that they were willing to bring him on as Boomer Esiason's backup. However, Rozelle vetoed the deal, citing the January arrest. He let it be known that he would not approve any NFL contract for Schlichter that season, costing him valuable work when the NFL players' union went on strike that year. He made another bid for reinstatement in 1988 but was turned down. That same year, he filed for bankruptcy to shield himself from creditors.

In parts of three seasons, Schlichter played only 13 games, primarily in backup or "mop-up" roles. He made only six starts, losing them all. He threw 202 passes and completed 91 of them. He threw three touchdown passes and 11 interceptions. He amassed a quarterback rating of only 42.6 and is considered one of the biggest draft failures in NFL history. In 2007, Schlichter was listed as the #7 all-time draft bust on the NFL Network's Top 10 Draft Busts episode. In an updated list from 2010, Schlichter was moved to the #4 draft bust of all time, and in a video listing the top 10 quarterback draft busts of all time, Schlichter was listed #3, behind #2 JaMarcus Russell and #1 Ryan Leaf. In 2007, Charles Robinson of Yahoo! Sports named Schlichter the worst #4 pick since the AFL-NFL merger, writing that Colts fans long felt chagrin that Jim McMahon was taken by the Chicago Bears with the very next pick. McMahon would lead the Bears to victory in Super Bowl XX in the same season that Schlichter's NFL career all but ended. In 2021, The Athletic named him the worst #4 pick since the merger, noting that the Colts took Schlichter with McMahon and future Hall of Fame running back Marcus Allen on the board.

Schlichter said years later that he was distracted for much of his NFL career. He went through a messy break-up with his girlfriend before his rookie season and the ensuing depression led him to gamble more. He believed the accolades he received after his sophomore year at Ohio State diminished his drive and the pressure of living up to that praise led him to gamble more.

After spending 1987 out of football, Schlichter signed a contract with the Ottawa Rough Riders of the Canadian Football League (CFL) in 1988. He was named the starter out of camp and saw his first meaningful game action in three years. However, he suffered broken ribs from a hit midway through the season. The Rough Riders placed him on injured reserve for 30 days then released him.

Schlichter played for the Detroit Drive of the Arena Football League (AFL) in 1990 and 1991, where he was named MVP in the former en route to winning ArenaBowl IV. His AFL success was attributed to his frequent deep passes, which caught opposing defenses off guard in an era when most AFL offenses relied on short passes. Ahead the 1992 season, Schlichter was traded to the expansion Cincinnati Rockers, with league officials believing his popularity in Ohio would generate interest for the franchise. Schlichter helped lead the Rockers to the playoffs in their inaugural season, but announced he was retiring from football that October. Although he said he intended instead to focus on his radio career and curing his gambling addiction, evidence has come to light that Schlichter was forced to retire rather than face being banned from the league for betting on AFL games.

Radio career
While co-hosting a Rockers-focused radio show on WSAI, he did well enough that he became the station's afternoon drive-time host. He was a communications major at Ohio State and had done some radio work in his high school and college days. During this time, he appeared on The Phil Donahue Show, talking about his addiction. In 1994, he moved to KVEG in Las Vegas but was fired after a few months for stealing checks from station owner Jerry Kutner in order to get money to gamble.

Extent of addiction
Schlichter often stole and conned money from friends and strangers when he ran low on funds to support his gambling. He also passed bad checks, as casinos still accepted personal checks when he started gambling. He wrote that he would write a check to the casino and use the money to gamble, believing he would win enough money to pay the casino back and keep the profit, but he almost always lost. In a 2007 interview for ESPN's Outside the Lines, he estimated that he'd stolen $1.5 million over the years, if not more.

Between 1987 and 1992, Schlichter was arrested three times in Ohio for passing a total of $50,000 in bad checks, but received probation or suspended sentences each time. He moved to Las Vegas in 1989 soon after marrying longtime girlfriend Mitzi Shinaver. He claims this was in hopes of getting treatment for his addiction; however, his gambling continued unabated.

Schlichter ran up massive gambling debts while playing for the Detroit Drive, although general manager Gary Vitto helped pay some of them off. Vitto and owner Mike Ilitch tried their best to help him, keeping him on a budget and requiring him to attend meetings with Gamblers Anonymous and therapists. However, according to a 1995 profile of Schlichter in Columbus Monthly, things escalated to the point that even without the AFL wanting to give the expansion Rockers a shot in the arm, he would have had to leave Detroit for his own safety. Soon after arriving in Cincinnati, he was arrested in July for passing a bad check. He admitted suffering a relapse, but the Rockers were willing to stand by him. They worked out a deal with Schlichter in which they put most of his paycheck into an account to pay his gambling debts, except for $300 which they gave to Mitzi. Even then, his gambling continued unabated; at various points in the 1992 season, there were police waiting for Schlichter in the dressing room. 

By the end of the 1992 season, the Rockers were losing patience with Schlichter and asked him to take a substantial pay cut if he wanted to return for the 1993 season. In a 2020 interview, former AFL commissioner Joe O'Hara said that around this time, Las Vegas oddsmaker Roxy Roxborough alerted league officials that Schlichter was betting on AFL games. When O'Hara learned this, he ordered the Rockers to release Schlichter. However, he was allowed to save face by publicly announcing his retirement.

The pattern continued during his time as a sports talk host. According to longtime Cincinnati radio personality Mike Wolfe, who worked with Schlichter at WSAI, Schlichter was known to try to wrangle money out of callers. Station management covered for him when a victim of one of his cons came after him. Kutner recalled that at KVEG, his penchant for bilking his friends and bouncing checks was a topic of on-air discussion.

The habit took a considerable toll on his marriage. Schlichter pawned off Mitzi's wedding ring to get money to gamble, only to discover it had been sold when he tried to get it back. He frequently stayed up late tracking scores; Mitzi often found him vomiting the next morning from what he claimed was the flu, but was really nerves. He also stole money from Mitzi as well.

Mitzi claims that, in order to protect herself and her children, she never allowed Art to have a checkbook. She only reluctantly agreed to move with him to Las Vegas for a second time in 1994, warning him that it was his last chance. His father and other family members questioned the move, knowing that his real motivation was to gamble legally. Kutner also had doubts, knowing about Schlichter's penchant for gambling. Soon after they arrived in Las Vegas, he took a box of old checks from her sister and used them to get money to gamble. He lost it all, and when it was apparent he couldn't pay it back, the bank reported him to the FBI. Mitzi lost patience with him and took her two daughters back to Indiana. After losing hundreds of thousands of dollars, along with virtually all he owned, he went back to Indiana as well in hopes of reconciling with Mitzi.

Soon afterward, in October, he was charged with fraud for passing $175,000 in bad checks at Las Vegas casinos, many of which he'd stolen from Kutner. He'd passed most of the checks at Treasure Island. When he pleaded guilty, federal prosecutors were initially willing to offer a deal that would let him self-report to a federal prison camp for a sentence of 15 months. However, when prosecutors learned that he'd been passing bad checks in Indiana as well, they persuaded a judge to remand him to custody. In January 1995, he was sentenced to two years in prison. Prosecutors later discovered Schlichter had passed $500,000 in bad checks in Indiana, Nevada, and his native Ohio.

He was released in April 1996 after serving 16 months, only to be arrested again that fall for stealing checks from his employer and using them to get $8,500 to gamble. This time, he was sentenced to eight years in federal prison. Mitzi formally divorced him soon afterward, in 1998. He was released on probation in 1999 after serving 13 months. Schlichter returned home to Bloomingburg, where he told friends that he still had connections to get prime tickets for Buckeye football games. He told others that if they fronted him the money to buy the tickets, he would share the profits, but instead used the money to gamble. He ultimately stole $500,000 from a dozen individuals—including his father—before he was arrested, pled guilty and sentenced to five years in prison.

Between 1995 and 2006, Schlichter served the equivalent of 10 years in 44 different county jails and federal prisons. Counting time served while awaiting sentencing, he spent all but 358 days between November 1994 and June 2006 behind bars. During that time, he also had his public defender, Linda Wagoner, smuggle a cell phone into the Marion County, Indiana jail so he could place bets. Wagoner was sentenced to two years' probation and had her law license suspended for 90 days.  

Schlichter later said that he hit rock bottom in 2004, after he was caught gambling in prison and placed in solitary confinement. He was originally supposed to spend four months there, but was released after 100 days for good behavior. 

He was released from prison on June 16, 2006, and resided with his mother in Washington Court House, Ohio. By one estimate, he owed half a million dollars in restitution.

Schlichter founded a non-profit organization, Gambling Prevention Awareness, to educate others about the perils of compulsive gambling, including college and NFL players. He told ESPN that he started gambling because the pressure of being Ohio State's starting quarterback was too much on him, and he wanted to be just a regular guy.

In late 2009, Schlichter and his mother appeared in TV ads opposing an Ohio casino statewide ballot issue. He also wrote an autobiography, Busted, with sportswriter Jeff Snook. Also in 2009, he began working at Columbus radio station WTVN, joining longtime host John Corby on Wednesdays.

2011 arrest
Around the same time, Schlichter reunited with Anita Vatko Barney, a Columbus heiress and the widow of the former CEO of Wendy's. Her son, Alan Vatko, had been gravely injured in a 1981 plane crash that killed his father and three others; Barney believed that Alan's recovery was due in large part to Schlichter visiting his bedside. Over the next two-plus years, Schlichter conned over a million dollars out of Barney, nearly depleting her fortune.

On February 9, 2011, reports emerged that Schlichter was under investigation for fraud. It subsequently emerged that Schlichter had conned thousands of dollars under the pretense of buying prime seats at Ohio State football games. Schlichter was charged with a first-degree felony in connection with the theft of more than $1 million on February 14, 2011.

Prosecutors later said that Schlichter started gambling again almost as soon as he left prison. They discovered he'd visited gambling dens in Nevada, West Virginia, Indiana, and casino riverboats along the Ohio River. He relaunched his ticket-buying scheme as early as 2009. Corby recalled that in that year, Schlichter suggested that he had connections to get Buckeye basketball tickets. Corby almost went along, but thought better of it after his wife noticed it was very similar to a scheme Schlichter described in his book. As it turned out, Schlichter got tickets from ticket brokers across central Ohio, often paying four times face value. As the scheme went along, he forced Barney to solicit her wealthy friends for money and help him buy tickets.

By late 2010, Schlichter sensed he was nearing the end of his tether. In a desperate attempt to stem the tide, he promised to get tickets for Super Bowl XLV. However, when that scheme collapsed, Schlichter turned himself in on February 9, 2011. He subsequently admitted that he "probably" used part of the money to gamble.

On September 15, 2011, Schlichter pleaded guilty to state charges of theft and engaging in a pattern of corrupt activity. He was sentenced to 10 years in state prison. A month later, on October 11, he pleaded guilty to federal charges of wire fraud, bank fraud and filing a false tax return. He admitted to using the money he obtained from the ticket scam to either gamble, pay back previous debts, or buy personal items. He also admitted to falsifying his 2008 tax return and hiding almost $38,500 in income from the government.

While under house arrest awaiting assignment to a state prison, Schlichter tested positive for cocaine while serving house arrest on federal charges resulting from the same case (and while still on probation from his Indiana sentence) on January 19, 2012. On May 4, 2012, as a result of the positive drug test, Schlichter was sentenced to 10 years, 7 months in federal prison (up from an original 8 years, 4 months sentence originally agreed to on the fraud case) to be served concurrently with the Ohio sentence, plus $2.2 million in restitution; the Indiana probation was canceled with the federal sentence. Barney admitted her role in the scheme, and cooperated with prosecutors and law enforcement to bring Schlichter down. She was later sentenced to three years' probation. She was also ordered to pay $400,000 in restitution, forcing her to auction off nearly all she owned and give up her house.

In 2015, Barney published a book, Quarterback Sneak, recounting her experiences with Schlichter. She believes that Schlichter set his sights on her soon after they met at a church in Westerville, Ohio, where he was speaking about his addiction. She also believes that in hindsight, she missed a number of red flags about Schlichter's story; while he talked a lot about the impact his addiction had on him, he never mentioned his wife and children.

Schlichter was incarcerated at FCI Williamsburg in Salters, South Carolina and later spent time at FCI Florence in Florence, Colorado. According to The Indianapolis Star, he continued to gamble while in prison; he had women place bets for him and was running a Super Bowl ticket scheme from inside prison. When prison officials learned about it, they cut off his email access for 90 days. He was released from federal prison on August 18, 2020, and transferred to Ohio state custody to serve the remainder of his sentence. His lawyers had attempted to get the remainder of his sentence waived for health reasons. However, Franklin County Common Pleas judge Chris Brown took a dim view of the request, saying that Schlichter was "past the point of rehabilitation" and had not shown that he would "conduct (himself appropriately)" if released. Brown added that he was sympathetic to Schlichter's health concerns, and would have been more than willing to grant an early release if there was any evidence of remorse. However, Brown said, Schlichter had "demonstrated over and over" that he could not be trusted. 

Schlichter, Ohio Department of Rehabilitation and Correction inmate #A777924, was incarcerated at Ohio State Penitentiary in Youngstown. He was paroled on June 14, 2021; his second day of eligibility.

Health issues
Doctors have diagnosed Schlichter with Parkinson's disease and dementia—the side effects of numerous concussions (between 15 and 17, depending on the source) suffered over 20 years of football at junior high, high school, college and professional levels. His public defender in the 2011 case, Steven Nolder, said that Schlichter has been diagnosed with "deficits" in his frontal lobes, which have been linked to depression, impulsivity and impaired judgment. According to Snook, doctors believe that Schlichter has chronic traumatic encephalopathy, a degenerative disease caused by repeated blows to the head.  Protective equipment (especially helmets) was inferior during much of Schlichter's high school, collegiate and NFL days. Even during his CFL and Arena League days, head injuries were just considered part of the game.

In popular culture
Schlichter was mentioned in the 2006 Prison Break episode "By the Skin and the Teeth" and in 2017 was the subject of Season 11, Episode 14 of American Greed titled "Art Schlichter, All American Fraud."

See also
 1978 Ohio State Buckeyes football team – 1978 Gator Bowl
 1979 Ohio State Buckeyes football team – 1980 Rose Bowl
 1980 Ohio State Buckeyes football team – 1980 Fiesta Bowl
 1981 Ohio State Buckeyes football team – 1981 Liberty Bowl

References

Further reading

External links
 Arena football statistics
 Ohio State statistics at Sports Reference

1960 births
Living people
American people of German descent
Players of American football from Ohio
People from Washington Court House, Ohio
American football quarterbacks
Ohio State Buckeyes football players
Baltimore Colts players
Indianapolis Colts players
Detroit Drive players
Cincinnati Rockers players
American players of Canadian football
Canadian football quarterbacks
Ottawa Rough Riders players
American people convicted of theft
Criminals from Ohio
Prisoners and detainees of Ohio
American sportspeople convicted of crimes